Saint-Donat is a commune in France.

It may also refer to: 

 Saint-Donat Airfield, a World War II military airfield in Algeria
 Saint-Donat, Lanaudière, Quebec
 Saint-Donat, Bas-Saint-Laurent, Quebec
 Saint-Donat-sur-l'Herbasse, a commune in south-eastern France
 St Donats (Welsh: Sain Dunwyd), a village and community in south Wales
 Châteauneuf-Val-Saint-Donat, a commune in the Alpes-de-Haute-Provence department in southeastern France

See also
 Saint Donatus, several people